Jan Bull (7 January 1927 – 16 December 1985) was a Norwegian author and theater instructor. Born in Paris,  he was son of the Norwegian poet Olaf Bull and the grandson of author Jacob Breda Bull.

Bibliography  
 13 poetry – poetry (1957).
 Marianne – (1959)
 Sommerfuglene (1960)
 Den siste fuglen – poetry (1961)
 Sodoma – poetry (1964)
 En vanligvis godt underrettet kilde – poetry (1967)
 Masker – poetry (1976)
 Døden ville lese Dickens – novel (1981)

Awards
1981– Riksmål Society Literature Prize

References

1927 births
1985 deaths
20th-century Norwegian poets
Norwegian male poets
20th-century Norwegian male writers